"Me and Michael" (stylized as Me & Michael) is a song by American rock band MGMT. It is the fourth single taken from the band's fourth studio album Little Dark Age. It was released worldwide on February 7, 2018, through Columbia.

Background
The song was heavily influenced by English electronic band Orchestral Manoeuvres in the Dark (OMD). Talking to Q, the band discussed the origin of the titular "Michael" with Ben Goldwasser saying the original refrain was written as "me and my girl," but decided it was "so boring and cheesy" and decided to change it into "me and Michael." Goldwasser said this "developed into this ambiguous story, and we really liked that – writing a catchy song that gets you pumped-up, but you have no idea what the message is."

Music video
The music video for Me and Michael was directed by Joey Frank and Randy Lee Maitland and was released on February 7, 2018. The video has been viewed over 3 million times through the band's official Vevo account on YouTube.

The video tells the story of MGMT learning of the consequences of "stealing" the song from the Filipino band True Faith, who in reality did not write the song, but were invited by MGMT to make a cover, titled "Ako at si Michael", and star in the music video.
It features Michael Buscemi (brother of Steve Buscemi), who also made the video's title card.

Track listing

Charts

References

2018 singles
2018 songs
MGMT songs
Song recordings produced by Patrick Wimberly
Songs written by Andrew VanWyngarden
Songs written by Benjamin Goldwasser